Sphiximorpha is a genus of hoverfly.

Systematics
Species include:

  Sphiximorpha africana   (Hull, 1944) 
  Sphiximorpha alaplicata   (Hardy, 1945) 
  Sphiximorpha barbiger   (Loew, 1853) 
  Sphiximorpha barbipes   (Loew, 1853) 
  Sphiximorpha bezzii   (Hervé-Bazin, 1913) 
  Sphiximorpha bigotii   (Williston, 1888) 
  Sphiximorpha bigotii   (Williston, 1888) 
  Sphiximorpha boliviana   (Kertész, 1903) 
  Sphiximorpha brauerii   (Williston, 1888) 
  Sphiximorpha brevilumbata  (Yang & Cheng, 1998) 
  Sphiximorpha breviscapa   (Saunders, 1845) 
  Sphiximorpha bulbosa   (Meijere, 1924) 
  Sphiximorpha cylindrica   ( Curran, 1921) 
  Sphiximorpha decorata   ( Brunetti, 1923) 
  Sphiximorpha delicatula   (Hull, 1941) 
  Sphiximorpha dentipes   (Doesburg, 1955) 
  Sphiximorpha durani   (Davidson, 1925) 
  Sphiximorpha facialis   (Kertész, 1903) 
  Sphiximorpha flavosignata   (Kertész, 1902) 
  Sphiximorpha fruhstorferi   (Meijere, 1908) 
  Sphiximorpha fulvescens   ( Brunetti, 1915) 
  Sphiximorpha garibaldii  (Rondani, 1860) 
  Sphiximorpha kerteszi   (Shannon, 1925) 
  Sphiximorpha loewii   (Williston, 1887) 
  Sphiximorpha mallea   (Hull, 1945) 
  Sphiximorpha marginalis   (Bezzi, 1915) 
  Sphiximorpha mcalpinei   (Thompson , 2012) 
  Sphiximorpha meadei   (Williston, 1892) 
  Sphiximorpha meijerei   (Shannon, 1927) 
  Sphiximorpha mikii   (Williston, 1888) 
  Sphiximorpha minuta   (Hull, 1944) 
  Sphiximorpha nigripennis   (Williston, 1887) 
  Sphiximorpha petronillae (Rondani, 1850) 
  Sphiximorpha phya   (Riek, 1954) 
  Sphiximorpha picta   (Kertész, 1902) 
  Sphiximorpha polista   (Séguy, 1948) 
  Sphiximorpha polistes   ( Curran, 1941) 
  Sphiximorpha polistiformis   (Hull, 1944)  
  Sphiximorpha pyrrhocera   (Kertész, 1903) 
  Sphiximorpha rachmaninovi   (Violovich, 1981) 
  Sphiximorpha roederii   (Williston, 1888) 
  Sphiximorpha rubrobrunnea   (Hull, 1944)  
  Sphiximorpha sackenii   (Williston, 1888) 
  Sphiximorpha shannoni   (Lane & Carrera, 1943) 
  Sphiximorpha siamensis   ( Curran, 1931) 
  Sphiximorpha sinensis   (Ôuchi, 1943) 
  Sphiximorpha subcastanea   ( Brunetti, 1929) 
  Sphiximorpha subsessilis   (Illiger, 1807) 
  Sphiximorpha superba   (Williston, 1887) 
  Sphiximorpha triangulifera   ( Brunetti, 1913) 
  Sphiximorpha trichopoda   (Kertész, 1903) 
  Sphiximorpha variabilis   (Kertész, 1903) 
  Sphiximorpha vicina   (Kertész, 1902) 
  Sphiximorpha Willistoni   (Kahl, 1897)  
  Sphiximorpha worelli   (Bradescu, 1972) 
  Sphiximorpha wulpii  (Williston, 1888)
  Sphiximorpha yoshikawai   (Sasakawa, 1960) 
 '' Sphiximorpha ziegleri  (Gilasian, Vujic, Hauser & Parchami-Araghi, 2017 )

References

Hoverfly genera
Taxa named by Camillo Rondani
Eristalinae